"Galaxie" is a single by American rock band Blind Melon. It was originally recorded for their second studio album Soup.

Track listing
 "Galaxie" 2:52
 "Wilt (Demo)" 2:30
 "Car Seat (God's Presents)" 2:43
 "Change" 3:41
a double exists
 "Galaxie" 2:52
 "2*4" 2:30
 "Change" 3:41
 "Galaxie" 2:52
 "Wilt (Demo)" 2:30
 "Car Seat (God's Presents)" 2:43

Song meaning
The song uses the main subject matter of Shannon Hoon's 1963 Ford Galaxie to also explore the deeper themes of his first love and break-up. He had originally bought this car used in New Orleans, for rather cheap, as the doors wouldn't even open.  The original title for the song was called "I'm a Freak," but Shannon hated the original lyrics and refused to sing them.  During the recording sessions Shannon would get frustrated and drive around the city in the car.  Glenn Graham believes it was during one of these drives that Shannon came up with the final lyrics to the song. Shannon never confirmed this claim.

Music video
The music video for "Galaxie" featured a cameo by Timothy Leary, and revolves around a 1967 Ford Galaxie, fitting the lyrics. The video is considered a haunting premonition of Hoon's overdose later in 1995: Hoon was on drugs while filming the video, and featured such an erratic behaviour that scared the rest of the band - guitarist Christopher Thorn was quoted saying "I get nauseous when I see that video, just watching Shannon just disintegrate in front of your eyes...".

Charts

References

External links
 

Blind Melon songs
1995 singles
1995 songs
Music videos directed by Jake Scott (director)